The 1953 Duke Blue Devils baseball team represented Duke University in the 1953 NCAA baseball season. The Blue Devils played their home games at Jack Coombs Field. The team was coached by Ace Parker in his 1st year at Duke.

The Blue Devils won the District III playoff to advanced to the College World Series, where they were defeated by the Boston College Eagles.

Roster

Schedule 

! style="" | Regular Season
|- valign="top" 

|- align="center" bgcolor="#ffcccc"
| 1 || March 25 || at  || Unknown • Greenville, South Carolina || 4–5 || 0–1 || 0–1
|- align="center" bgcolor="#ccffcc"
| 2 || March 26 || at  || Riggs Field • Clemson, South Carolina || 5–4 || 1–1 || 1–1
|- align="center" bgcolor="#ccffcc"
| 3 || March 27 || at  || Unknown • Davidson, North Carolina || 11–2 || 2–1 || 2–1
|- align="center" bgcolor="#ccffcc"
| 4 || March 30 ||  || Jack Coombs Field • Durham, North Carolina || 11–3 || 3–1 || 2–1
|- align="center" bgcolor="#ffcccc"
| 5 || March 31 || Penn || Jack Coombs Field • Durham, North Carolina || 5–6 || 3–2 || 2–1
|-

|- align="center" bgcolor="#ccffcc"
| 6 || April 1 ||  || Jack Coombs Field • Durham, North Carolina || 17–14 || 4–2 || 2–1
|- align="center" bgcolor="#ccffcc"
| 7 || April 2 ||  || Jack Coombs Field • Durham, North Carolina || 1–0 || 5–2 || 2–1
|- align="center" bgcolor="#ccffcc"
| 8 || April 3 || Michigan State|| Jack Coombs Field • Durham, North Carolina || 7–3 || 6–2 || 2–1
|- align="center" bgcolor="#ffcccc"
| 9 || April 4 ||  || Jack Coombs Field • Durham, North Carolina || 2–7 || 6–3 || 2–1
|- align="center" bgcolor="#ccffcc"
| 10 || April 11 ||  || Jack Coombs Field • Durham, North Carolina || 8–4 || 7–3 || 3–1
|- align="center" bgcolor="#ccffcc"
| 11 || April 15 || at  || Riddick Stadium • Raleigh, North Carolina || 12–4 || 8–3 || 4–1
|- align="center" bgcolor="#ccffcc"
| 12 || April 18 || Davidson || Jack Coombs Field • Durham, North Carolina || 15–4 || 9–3 || 5–1
|- align="center" bgcolor="#ffcccc"
| 13 || April 21 || at  || Emerson Field • Chapel Hill, North Carolina || 2–5 || 9–4 || 5–2
|- align="center" bgcolor="#ffcccc"
| 14 || April 22 || at Wake Forest || Unknown • Winston-Salem, North Carolina || 1–4 || 9–5 || 5–3
|- align="center" bgcolor="#ccffcc"
| 15 || April 25 || NC State || Jack Coombs Field • Durham, North Carolina || 23–3 || 10–5 || 6–3
|- align="center" bgcolor="#ccffcc"
| 16 || April 28 || at  || Unknown • Annapolis, Maryland || 4–1 || 11–5 || 6–3
|-

|- align="center" bgcolor="#ccffcc"
| 17 || May 2 ||  || Jack Coombs Field • Durham, North Carolina || 4–0 || 12–5 || 7–3
|- align="center" bgcolor="#ccffcc"
| 18 || May 4 || at North Carolina || Emerson Field • Chapel Hill, North Carolina || 4–2 || 13–5 || 8–3
|- align="center" bgcolor="#ffcccc"
| 19 || May 5 || at NC State || Riddick Stadium • Raleigh, North Carolina || 0–5 || 13–6 || 8–4
|- align="center" bgcolor="#ccffcc"
| 20 || May 8 || Wake Forest || Jack Coombs Field • Durham, North Carolina || 4–1 || 14–6 || 9–4
|- align="center" bgcolor="#ffcccc"
| 21 || May 9 || North Carolina || Jack Coombs Field • Durham, North Carolina || 1–3 || 14–7 || 9–5
|-

|-
|-
! style="" | Postseason
|- valign="top"

|- align="center" bgcolor="#ccffcc"
| 22 || May 14 || vs  || Devereaux Meadow • Raleigh, North Carolina || 6–4 || 15–7 || 9–5
|- align="center" bgcolor="#ccffcc"
| 23 || May 15 || vs North Carolina || Devereaux Meadow • Raleigh, North Carolina || 7–2 || 16–7 || 9–5
|- align="center" bgcolor="#ccffcc"
| 24 || May 16 || vs North Carolina || Devereaux Meadow • Raleigh, North Carolina || 8–4 || 17–7 || 9–5
|-

|- align="center" bgcolor="#ccffcc"
| 25 || June 2 || vs  || Unknown • Charlotte, North Carolina || 9–1 || 18–7 || 9–5
|- align="center" bgcolor="#ffcccc"
| 26 || June 3 || vs  || Unknown • Charlotte, North Carolina || 4–9 || 18–8 || 9–5
|- align="center" bgcolor="#ccffcc"
| 27 || June 3 || vs Mississippi State || Unknown • Charlotte, North Carolina || 5–4 || 19–8 || 9–5
|- align="center" bgcolor="#ccffcc"
| 28 || June 4 || vs Georgia || Unknown • Charlotte, North Carolina || 9–1 || 20–8 || 9–5
|- align="center" bgcolor="#ccffcc"
| 29 || June 4 || vs Georgia || Unknown • Charlotte, North Carolina || 11–3 || 21–8 || 9–5
|-

|- align="center" bgcolor="#ffcccc"
| 30 || June 11 || vs Texas || Omaha Municipal Stadium • Omaha, Nebraska || 1–2 || 21–9 || 9–5
|- align="center" bgcolor="#ccffcc"
| 31 || June 12 || vs Colorado State || Omaha Municipal Stadium • Omaha, Nebraska || 3–2 || 22–9 || 9–5
|- align="center" bgcolor="#ffcccc"
| 32 || June 13 || vs Boston College || Omaha Municipal Stadium • Omaha, Nebraska || 6–7 || 22–10 || 9–5
|-

References 

Duke Blue Devils baseball seasons
Duke Blue Devils baseball
College World Series seasons
Duke
Southern Conference baseball champion seasons